Prodigy, Prodigies or The Prodigy may refer to:

 Child prodigy, a child who produces meaningful output to the level of an adult expert performer
 Chess prodigy, a child who can beat experienced adult players at chess

Arts, entertainment, and media

Fictional characters
 Prodigy, a persona of Spider-Man in the Spider-Man: Identity Crisis storyline
 Prodigy (Ritchie Gilmore), a Marvel Comics superhero
 Prodigy (David Alleyne), a Marvel Comics superhero commonly associated with the X-Men
 Franziska von Karma, an Ace Attorney character also known as "The Prodigy"

Film
 The Prodigies (film), a 2011 French-British film
 The Prodigy (film), a 2019 American horror thriller film

Television
 "Prodigy", a 2000 episode of Dark Angel
 "Prodigy", a 2001 episode of Stargate SG-1 (season 4)
 The Prodigy (TV series), a proposed 2007 reality TV show that never aired
 Star Trek: Prodigy (TV series), a 2021 children's science fiction TV series

Literature
Prodigy (comics), a comic book series 
 Prodigy (novel), a 2013 novel by Marie Lu
 Beneath the Wheel or The Prodigy, a 1906 novel by Hermann Hesse
 Isaac Asimov's Robot City: Prodigy, a 1988 novel by Arthur Byron Cover
 "The Prodigies", an 1897 short story by Willa Cather

Music

 Fender Prodigy, an electric guitar produced from 1991 to 1993
 Moog Prodigy, a synthesiser
 The Prodigy, a British electronic music group, named after the Moog Prodigy synthesizer

Other uses in arts, entertainment, and media
 Prodigy (video game), a tactical role-playing game
 The Prodigy (newspaper), the University of California, Merced student newspaper

People
 Prodigy (rapper), Albert Johnson (1974–2017), American rapper and member of Mobb Deep
 Prodigy, Craig Crippen, a member of Mindless Behavior
 Tommaso Ciampa (born 1985), ring name Prodigy, American professional wrestler
 B.J. Penn (born 1978), known as The Prodigy, an American mixed martial artist

Science and technology
 Prodigy (online service), an early online service provider
 Ford Prodigy, a low emission vehicle concept car
 HTC Wizard or HTC Prodigy, a smartphone

Other uses
 Prodigy Finance, a financial company lending to students

See also
 Child star (disambiguation)
 Genius (disambiguation)
 Maestro (disambiguation)
 Savant (disambiguation)
 The Prodigal (disambiguation)
 Virtuoso (disambiguation)
 Wiz (disambiguation)
 Prodigium, an unnatural deviation from the predictable order, in ancient Roman religion
 Prodigium (EP), by Head Phones President